D'Sound (stylized as d'sound) is a Norwegian neo soul band based in Oslo, Norway. The band was formed in 1993 with a line-up composed of lead vocalist Simone Eriksrud, bassist Jonny Sjo and drummer Kim Ofstad. After Eriksrud's initial departure in 2018, the band announced that they would continue as a duo and  collaborate with various international artists to provide vocals for future material. Bae Louie band member Mirjam Omdal joined in 2019 as a lead vocalist. Eriksrud returned to the band as a touring member in 2022.

Band history

Drummer Kim Ofstad (born 25 November 1969) and bassist Jonny Sjo (born 7 April 1969) met while both attending Berklee College of Music. D'Sound was formed back in 1993 in Oslo with vocalist Simone Eriksrud (nee Larsen; born 21 August 1970) at a coincident rehearsal-meeting. Their debut album, Spice of Life, was released in 1997, followed by the successful single "Real Name", and was nominated for two "Spellemannpriser", the Norwegian equivalent of the Brits (United Kingdom) and the Grammys (United States). D'Sound's blend of jazz and pop with funky elements was well received, and they also gained recognition as a live act. Their second album, Beauty Is a Blessing, was released in 1998 and won the "Spellemannpris" for Best Norwegian Pop Group. It received platinum certification in Norway; however, the album was never released internationally. The second single, "Down on the Street" (originally a hit for British jazz-funk band Shakatak) also entered the UK club chart. The single "Tattooed on My Mind" was released with favorable reception in Southeast Asia.

In 2000, the band resumed working together on their next album in Jonny Sjo's home studio. After a long period of writing material, Talkin' Talk was recorded. For the first time, the band also produced the album, along with their long-time keyboardist Stein Austrud. In the production of their third album, D'Sound was heavily influenced by modern R&B American artists such as Angie Stone, D'Angelo, Jill Scott and Erykah Badu. The album Talkin' Talk was mixed in Virginia Beach, United States by Serban Ghenea, whose credits include work for Janet Jackson and Prince. For the subsequent tour, D'Sound joined with numerous national and international musicians and toured Norway with the songs from their three albums. Several international musicians like DJ Kemit from American hip-hop group Arrested Development also joined the band in touring. The title track from the album was used by Nokia in an ad campaign in 2001 to promote their 8310 cellphone in Asia, where the album gained a favourable reception.

In 2003, the group released Doublehearted, which featured the hit single "Do I Need a Reason". In 2004, their first greatest hits album was released, entitled Smooth Escapes - The Very Best of D'Sound. The album was followed by the release of their fifth studio album My Today, the following year. The band took a break after the release of their fourth album. Kim Ofstad left D'Sound in 2010, paring the band down to a duo of Eriksrud and Sjo, but returned in 2013.

In June 2018, Simone Eriksrud announced her departure from D'Sound and was replaced by Mirjam Omdal because the former wanted to spend more time with the rest of her family.

In March 2019, D’Sound participated in the Norwegian national selection for the Eurovision Song Contest 2019 (the Melodi Grand Prix), with their new song "Mr. Unicorn" and finished in third place. In September 2019, D’Sound released their eighth studio album, Unicorn. Its cover features Sjo's brother and its title is dedicated to him. It contained tracks that featured Omdal as the band's main vocalist and collaborations with other artists and musicians such Armi Millare. In 2020, Omdal announced that she had returned to her band Bae Louie as a lead vocal but will continue to collaborate with Ofstad and Sjo as a touring member.

In 2021, D’Sound announced that their ninth studio album “25” will be released in January 2022. The album's title commemorates their 25 years since their debut album in 1997. Unlike the previous release, the album's tracklist will be a complete collaboration with many international artists and songwriters. Band vocalists Eriksrud and Omdal will also feature in some tracks. The first single and video from the album, “Save Some”, was released in May 2021 and kicked off their 25th anniversary since their debut with “Real Name” in 1996. “Save Some” is a collaboration with American R&B artist and songwriter Macy Gray. In September 2021, the group collaborated with Barbadian singer Shontelle for the album's second single “Necessary Love”. In December 2021, the band announced that they had reunited with Eriksrud through the release of the third single “Flashback”. The band began promoting the single and the album's release as a trio in 2022.

Line-up

Current members
Jonny Sjo - bass, occasional guitar, vocals 
Kim Ofstad - drums, percussion 
Simone Eriksrud - piano, guitar, lead vocals (1993–2018; touring member 2022–present)
Mirjam Omdal - lead vocals (2018–2020; touring member 2020–present)

Discography

Studio albums

Compilation albums

Live albums

Singles
"Real Name" (1996)
"All I Wanna Do" (1996)
"Ain’t Giving Up" (1998)
"Down On The Street" (1998)
"Disco Ironic" (1999)
"Talkin’ Talk" (2001)
"Sing My Name" (2001)
"Do I Need A Reason" (2002)
"I Just Can’t Wait" (2003)
"Breathe In, Breathe Out" (2003)
"I Give Myself Away" (2003)
"Romjulsdrøm"  (2003)
"If You Get Scared" (2004)
"Universally" (2005)
"Green Eyes" (2005)
"Feel Again" (2005)
"Lose Control" (2013)
"Love Like Rain" (2014)
"Dance with Me" (2015)
"If You Don't Know" (2017)
"Only One" (2017)
"It's Just Me" (2018)
"Join Me in My Head" (2018)
"Lykkelig"  (2018)
"Mr. Unicorn" (2019)
"This Island is Mine" (2019)
"Somewhere in Between"  (2019)
"Aftershock" (2019)
"Good Intentions" (2020)
"Save Some"  (2021)
"Necessary Love"  (2021)
"Good Nature"  (2021)
"Run for Cover"  (2021)
"Flashback" (2021)

References

External links

Norwegian pop music groups
Norwegian musical trios
Musical groups from Oslo
Musical groups established in 1993
1993 establishments in Norway
Spellemannprisen winners
Melodi Grand Prix contestants
Female-fronted musical groups